We Are Born is the fifth studio album by Australian singer-songwriter Sia. It was released on 18 June 2010. The album is more upbeat than her previous work, which she partly attributes to her relationship with JD Samson as well as her childhood influences Cyndi Lauper and Madonna. The album was produced by Greg Kurstin, and features The Strokes' guitarist Nick Valensi.

At the J Awards of 2010, the album was nominated for Australian Album of the Year.

The album's first single, "You've Changed" was released in December 2009 and the lead single, "Clap Your Hands", in April 2010.  We Are Born debuted at number 2 on the Australian Albums Chart and was Sia's first top 10 release in her home country. The album won Best Pop Release and Best Independent Release at the 2010 ARIA Music Awards. The album received Gold accreditation in the Australian ARIA charts in 2011.

Critical reception

We Are Born was received with generally favorable reviews with a score of 68 at Metacritic based on 14 reviews.
Entertainment Weekly said: "On We Are Born the chanteuse explores more caffeinated avenues...It's party music with a heart." Slant Magazine said: "While We Are Born may not be as immediate or distinctive a statement as its predecessor, there's ultimately very little about it that doesn't work."

The album was nominated for a J Award on 26 July 2010.

At the 2010 ARIA Music Awards the album was nominated for Album of the Year, Best Pop Release and Best Independent Release. "Clap Your Hands" was nominated for Single of the Year. Kris Moyes won best video for Sia's video for "Clap Your Hands".

Sia and Samuel Dixon were nominated for Song of the Year at the 2011 APRA Music Awards for the single "Clap Your Hands".

Commercial performance
We Are Born was noticeably more successful than Sia's previous work and charted in countries where no Sia album had charted before.

The album debuted at number 2 on the Australian Albums Chart behind Eminem's Recovery, at number 37 on the American Billboard 200 albums chart, at number 9 on the Greek international albums chart, number 7 on the Dutch Albums Chart, number 38 in Switzerland, number 78 in Belgium, number 14 in Denmark, number 24 in Finland, number 73 in Germany and number 60 in Canada. The album also debuted at #74 on the UK Albums Chart in the week ending 3 October 2010, making it her first album to reach the top 100 there.

The album received Gold accreditation for shipments of 35,000 copies in the Australian ARIA charts in 2011.

Track listing
All tracks were produced by Greg Kurstin.

Personnel
Credits adapted from Sia's official website.

 Henry Binns – composer
 Felix Bloxsom – drums, additional vocals
 Dan Carey – composer
 Madonna Ciccone – composer
 Pierre de Reeder – engineer
 Samuel Dixon – composer, bass
 Lauren Flax – composer
 Sia Furler – vocals, composer
 Brian Gardner – mastering
 Inara George – additional vocals
 Jesse Graham – composer
 Spencer Hoad – assistant engineer
 Simon Katz – composer

 Oliver Kraus – strings
 Greg Kurstin – producer, engineer, mix, keyboards, guitar, bass, xylophone, drums, programming
 Rachel Kurstin – project coordinator
 Patrick Leonard – composer
 Jolie Levine – production coordinator/contractor
 Eric Litz – assistant engineer
 Andrew Lynch – acoustic piano
 Aaron Redfield – drums
 Gus Seyffert – guitar
 Eric Spring – vocal recording
 Dave Trumfio – engineer, mix
 Nick Valensi – guitar

Charts

Certifications

References

2010 albums
Albums produced by Greg Kurstin
ARIA Award-winning albums
Contemporary R&B albums by Australian artists
New wave albums by Australian artists
Sia (musician) albums
Synth-pop albums by Australian artists